Fountain Valley or Fountains Valley may refer to:

Fountain Valley (British Columbia), Canada, a valley and rural community
Fountain Valley, California, U.S., a suburban city 
Fountain Valley High School
Fountain Valley, Wisconsin, U.S., an unincorporated community 
Fountains Valley, Pretoria, a recreational resort in South Africa

See also
Fountain Valley School of Colorado, in Colorado Springs, Colorado, U.S.
Fountain Valley massacre, a 1972 mass shooting at Fountain Valley Golf Course in St. Croix, United States Virgin Islands